Ed and Ross is a Canadian children's television series which aired on CBC Television in 1957 and 1959.

Premise
Ed McCurdy and Ross Snetsinger hosted this series which was geared towards children between age 8 and 14. The series was set in a magic house which featured various people and secret corridors. Guests included circus-style performers such as acrobats and jugglers. Music was performed by McCurdy.

Scheduling
This half-hour series was broadcast on Thursdays at 5:00 p.m. (Eastern) from 4 July to 25 September 1957, then in the same day and time for the second and final season from 2 July to 24 September 1959.

References

External links
 

CBC Television original programming
1950s Canadian children's television series
1957 Canadian television series debuts
1959 Canadian television series endings
Black-and-white Canadian television shows